Major John Edward Keith Rae (28 May 1919 – 27 March 2010) was a British soldier. He fought in World War II. He was awarded the Military Cross for his exploits in the Second World War, which included escaping from occupied France.

References

External links 
 Major Keith Rae: obituary in Daily Telegraph

1919 births
2010 deaths
Royal Horse Artillery officers
People from Hoylake
British Army personnel of World War II
Recipients of the Military Cross
People educated at Marlborough College
Alumni of Wye College
Escapees from German detention